Charles Edward Garman (December 18, 1850 – February 9, 1907) was professor of philosophy at Amherst College.

He taught pupils such as Calvin Coolidge and Robert S. Woodworth. He is credited with influencing Woodworth towards a career in psychology.

He was born on December 18, 1850, in Limington, Maine. He died on February 9, 1907, in Amherst, Massachusetts.

Garman married Eliza Miner in 1882. The joint papers of Charles E. Garman and Eliza Miner Garman Family Papers 1862-1932 are housed in the Special Collections Department at Amherst College's Frost Library. The collection contains correspondence, papers, essays, pamphlets, notes, notebooks and diaries relating to the personal and professional life of Charles Edward Garman, Professor of Moral and Mental Philosophy at Amherst College. His teaching career is represented by the printed pamphlets he distributed in his classes and by lecture notes taken by his students.

References

External links
 
 Charles E. Garman (AC 1872) and Eliza Miner Garman Family Papers from the Amherst College Archives & Special Collections

1850 births
1907 deaths
Amherst College faculty
Philosophers from Maine
People from Limington, Maine
People from Amherst, Massachusetts
Amherst College alumni